Matt Allison (born 13 June 1983 in Norwich) is a British racing driver. He is most well known for winning the 2006 British GT Championship and for racing in the British Touring Car Championship (BTCC). He progressed through the ranks of British Karting, winning two championships and two runner-up trophies before moving to Formula Ford in the 2000.

In his first year of car racing, Allison won the BRDC Formula Ford 1600 single seater championship. He progressed to the senior Ford 1800 category for 2001–2003 with numerous podium finishes and a championship best finish of 5th in 2002. Funding issues preventing a move to Formula Renault/F3 saw him switch to front wheel drive saloon racing in the form of the Renault Clio Cup. A 3rd place in only his third ever saloon car race meant that Allison was again at the front of a respected British championship and pushing for the title. Finishing 3rd overall with an impressive 12 podiums, he went on to win the highly prestigious Renault Clio Winter Cup Series in 2005.

In 2006 Allison saw his career take a big step forwards when he was given the opportunity to enter the world of sportscar racing in the British GT Championship. He drove his Porsches 911 GT3 to four wins, nine podiums and six pole positions to clinch his third British Championship in six years. Racing across Europe, Allison won the highly prestigious Pau Grand Prix Street Race in France in July 2006 beating over 60 entries from across Europe.

In late 2006 Allison participated in the last rounds of the FIA GT3 European Championship at Mugello in Italy, racing an Ascari KZ1. In torrential conditions he proved his talent in a car he barely knew by finishing second in both the two-hour races, Ascari's best results of the season.

In 2007 Allison entered the British Touring Car Championship racing for Motorbase Performance in their SEAT Toledo Cupras. He finished a very credible 6th in the Independents Trophy and 12th overall. His performance over the season won him widespread recognition as a touring car driver and he was rated in the Top 10 of the BTCC 2007 Season by Autosport in his first season.

In early 2008 Allison signed to drive a Chevrolet Lacetti for Robertshaw Racing in the 2008 British Touring Car Championship season. With little opportunity to test the car before the Media Day at Rockingham Motor Speedway, he finished 7th for the day on his first drive in the car justifying his high expectations for the season. He put in some good performances in the first 9 rounds of the series, picking up some good points, but the car was weighted down by the organisers, making it uncompetitive and Allison had to pull out after the Donington Park rounds due to financial problems. Despite this, Allison was still 17th in the championship.

Unable to secure a satisfactory full-time seat for 2009, Allison decided to take some time out to concentrate on his family business, for which he is the majority shareholder, and analyse opportunities from there.

It was not until 2011 that Allison made his racing return, in the highly competitive Renault Clio Cup. After three seasons away he showed no signs of slowing down, finishing 4th on his debut, and went on to score two popular wins at Croft.

2012 was a big year for Allison as he became a father for the first time with his wife Elise, and was also accepted as a full member of the British Racing Drivers Club (BRDC), a personal ambition of Allison's of which he is very proud.

Personal life
As well as being a keen golfer and tennis player, Allison runs the family's commercial vehicle garage in his home town, Norwich. He is a race instructor having worked at many of England's racing schools, and has undertaken corporate work for, amongst others, Mazda, Renault and Volvo.

Racing record

Complete British Touring Car Championship results
(key) (Races in bold indicate pole position – 1 point awarded in first race) (Races in italics indicate fastest lap- 1 point awarded all races) (* signifies that driver lead race for at least one lap – 1 point awarded all races)

References

External links
Profile on BTCCPages.com
Driver Profile on BTCC
Profile on btcc:action
Career BTCC results

British Touring Car Championship drivers
English racing drivers
1983 births
Living people
Formula Ford drivers
Ginetta GT4 Supercup drivers
Renault UK Clio Cup drivers
JHR Developments drivers